This list of countries by electrification rate sorts countries by the share of their inhabitants with access to electricity. Access to electricity is considered one of the prerequisites for a modern life. In 2018, 89.6% of the world population had access to electricity. Worldwide, there are major differences between urban and rural regions and the degree of electrification.

By country

By region

Historical development

References 

Electrification rate
Electrification